Peter Thomas Stanley Dix (6 May 1953 – 21 December 1988) was an Irish Olympic sailor who competed in the 470 in 1976.

Dix was born in Dublin and was an alumnus of St Columba's College, Dublin and Trinity College Dublin. His cousin was Olympic sailor Robert Dix, with whom he competed.

A member of the 5th Royal Inniskilling Dragoon Guards, he was killed when a terrorist bomb in the cargo hold of Pan Am Flight 103, where he was en route to New York City as a management consultant, was detonated over Lockerbie, Scotland in 1988. Abdelbaset al-Megrahi was convicted in 2001 of 270 counts of murder in connection with the bombing and was sentenced to life imprisonment.

References

1953 births
1988 deaths
Military personnel from Dublin (city)
Olympic sailors of Ireland
Irish male sailors (sport)
Sailors at the 1976 Summer Olympics – 470
Pan Am Flight 103 victims
People educated at St Columba's College, Dublin
Sportspeople from Dublin (city)
5th Royal Inniskilling Dragoon Guards officers